Lee Kuan Yew was the first Prime Minister of Singapore (1959–1990). A founding member of the governing People's Action Party (PAP), he is often credited for transforming Singapore from a third-world to a first-world country. He was known for practising political pragmatism in his governance of Singapore, but has been criticised for using authoritarian and heavy-handed policies. However, others argue his actions as having been necessary for the country's early development, and that he was a benevolent dictator.

Lee was elected Prime Minister of Singapore for 31 years, making him the longest-serving prime minister in the world at the time. 

Many world leaders have affirmed Lee's political knowledge as being insightful. Such supporters include former Prime Minister of the United Kingdom Margaret Thatcher, who remarked that Lee was "never wrong", and former US Secretary of State Henry Kissinger. Former President of the United States Barack Obama stated that he "personally appreciated [Lee's] wisdom." Former Prime Minister of Japan Shinzo Abe stated that Lee was "one of the greatest leaders of modern times that Asia has ever produced."

Foreign policy

Southeast Asia 
Lee initially believed that Singapore and Malaya were culturally, politically, economically, and socially similar, stating that "my generation had always believed that Singapore and Malaya were one". This led him to campaign for merger with Malaya from 1959 to 1963, including delivering a series of radio talks from 13 September to 9 October in 1961 defending the concept of merger, later dubbed the Battle for Merger. Subsequently, however, racial tensions between the ethnic Chinese and Malays led Lee to announce Singapore's separation from Malaysia on 9 August 1965, citing Malaysian Prime Minister Tunku Abdul Rahman's statement that "Singapore had to leave Malaysia or there would be bloodshed". Since 1965, Lee has criticised Malaysia's race-based policies such as the enshrinement of Malay privileges, which he argues has "place[d] the country at a disadvantage", citing the country's failure to retain Malaysian Chinese businesspeople and talent like Australian politician Penny Wong. Lee wrote that "Singapore and Malaysia have chosen two entirely different ways of organising our societies", and in 2013 argued that the coexistence of both states "separately but amicably" was the inevitable course of their relations.

Hong Kong 
Lee believed that the Sino-British Joint Declaration signed in 1984 was the best agreement possible for Hong Kong. Lee said Hong Kongers had to come to terms with the reality that there would be "nothing to stop Beijing from doing what it wanted" after the 1997 handover. He advised British diplomats stationed in Singapore in July 1989 following the Tiananmen Square protests that Beijing would reject any assertion of a separate and democratically based Hong Kong identity. In his memoir, From Third World to First: The Singapore Story, he stated that there was a "wide and deep gap" between what Hong Kong people wanted and expectations of China's leaders. He reinforced this view in One Man's View of the World when he stated that, in contrast to the Hong Kong people, "I don't believe the Chinese people themselves believe that with 1.3 billion people you can have one man, one vote for a president".

Europe 
Lee observed that the United Kingdom wanted a European Union more focused on the economic aspect of the single market, and not as a political integration project. Lee was also pessimistic about the euro and the European Union when he was interviewed for One Man's View of the World, stating that without real fiscal integration, the euro was doomed, and that without deeper integration into a United States of Europe, "Europe will be reduced to the role of supporting actor". Lee added that the EU was likely to fail because of "too fast an enlargement" and that the euro in its "present form" cannot be saved because “you cannot have monetary integration without fiscal integration”.

Wikileaks 
In 2010, WikiLeaks released classified communications documents from Lee to US leaders. In the documents, Lee described the North Korean regime as "psychopathic", described then Vice-President of the People's Republic of China Xi Jinping as a "princeling" and expressed his belief that the Japanese government may develop nuclear technologies in the future.

Domestic policy

Race 
Lee's policies and views on race have drawn both praise for their political pragmatism and success as well as criticism for being racially prejudiced. Lee's policies on race are regarded to have quashed historical racial tensions in Singapore, placing emphasis on multiracialism and equal protection under the law in the face of advocacy for special privileges granted to certain races. As prime minister, Lee aggressively promoted racial integration through his policies on language and culture, which many have described as social engineering.

Jury system 
Under Lee's tenure as prime minister, the judicial system was revamped. In 1959, the PAP submitted a bill in parliament to abolish jury trials for all cases except those involving capital punishment. In a speech on the bill, Lee criticised juries for being unrepresentative of the true populace of Singapore on the basis that only those fluent in the English language could understand and participate. Trials by jury were totally abolished in 1969. In his later years, Lee expressed that he disliked jury systems since his early days as a lawyer, and had "no faith in a system that allowed the superstition, ignorance, biases, and prejudices of seven jurymen to determine guilt or innocence."

Internal Security Act 
Lee has been criticised for his "free use" of the Internal Security Act (ISA), a statute that allows for detention without trial of any individual deemed dangerous to society. In response, he has stated that Singapore has "to lock up people, without trial... [or] the country would be in ruins." In 1963, he initiated and executed Operation Coldstore, a security operation that utilised the Preservation of Public Security Ordinance, a precursor to the ISA, to arrest 113 suspected communists and communist sympathisers. The legacy of Coldstore remains contentious, with historian PJ Thum stating in a parliamentary committee that "Coldstore was fundamentally motivated by political, not security, reasons."

Population planning 
It is said that Lee's policy in the 1960s and 1970s (stop at two) worked too well and the birth rate declined at a rapid rate and resulted in an ageing population.

In 2008, Lee said he was 'not quite sold' on idea of 6.5 million population for Singapore in a news article published in The Straits Times on 2 February 2008. He said he felt a population of 5.5 million would be the maximum that could live comfortably in the available space.

Political philosophy 
So when people say, 'Oh, ask the people!' It's childish rubbish. We are leaders. We know the consequences. You mean that ice-water man knows the consequences of his vote? They say people can think for themselves? Do you honestly believe that the chap who can't pass primary six knows the consequences of his choice when he answers a question viscerally on language, culture and religion? —Lee Kuan Yew, 1998. Lee was an outspoken critic of Western ideals of democracy, stating that "with a few exceptions, democracy has not brought good government to developing countries." He argued that in states such as China, the concept of democracy was simply "not workable", because of the large population size that had to be canvassed, while in India, the results of democracy "have not been spectacular". He believed in the state interference of the media and personal lives of citizens. He has been criticised for using his political power to wage lawsuits to bankrupt and imprison his political opponents, as in the case of J. B. Jeyaretnam and Chee Soon Juan. Francis Seow, the former solicitor-general of Singapore, has described Lee as such:[T]he prime minister uses the courts… to intimidate, bankrupt, or cripple the political opposition. Distinguishing himself in a caseful of legal suits commenced against dissidents and detractors for alleged defamation…, he has won them all.

LGBT rights 
Under Lee's tenure as prime minister, homosexuals were arrested and prosecuted under section 377A of the penal code. In his later years, Lee appeared to become more supportive of LGBT issues, expressing a belief that homosexuality was genetic and questioning the rationale behind its criminalisation. He believed that homosexuality would eventually be accepted in Singapore, but advocated for a measured and "pragmatic approach" toward the matter "to maintain social cohesion."

During a CNN radio interview in 1998, Lee was asked about LGBT rights in Singapore. The question was posed by an unnamed homosexual man in Singapore who asked about the future of LGBT people there. Lee replied that it was not for the government to decide whether or not homosexuality was acceptable but for the Singaporean society to decide. He also said he did not think an "aggressive gay rights movement" would change people's minds on the issue. He added that the government would not interfere or harass anybody, whether heterosexual or otherwise.

Saying he took a "purely practical view" on the issue, Lee said, "Look, homosexuality will eventually be accepted. It's already been accepted in China. It's only a matter of time before it is accepted here. If we get a Cabinet full of Christians, we're going to get an intolerant Cabinet. We're not going to allow that."

Asked whether Singapore was ready for a gay member of parliament, Lee said, "As far as I'm concerned, if she does her work as an MP, she looks after her constituents, she makes sensible speeches, she's making a contribution, her private life is her life, that's that."

At a Young PAP meeting in 2007, Loretta Chen, an openly lesbian young PAP member and a theatre director in Singapore, asked Lee if the current censorship rules in Singapore were too equivocal and where censorship was headed in the next two decades. Chen referred to a controversial play about Singaporean porn actress Annabel Chong which explored pornography and alternative sexuality. Lee was then asked if he believed homosexuality was a product of nature or nurture. He replied that he had asked doctors about homosexuality and had been told that it was caused by a genetic random transmission of genes. 

In a wide-ranging interview conducted on 24 August 2007 at the Istana with Leonard M. Apcar, deputy managing editor of the International Herald Tribune, Singapore correspondent Wayne Arnold, and Southeast Asia bureau chief Seth Mydans, Lee said, "we take an ambiguous position. We say, O.K., leave them alone but let's leave the law as it is for the time being and let's have no gay parades."

In Lee's book Hard Truths to Keep Singapore Going. Lee stated that if one of his grandchildren turned out to be homosexual, he would accept his grandchild because he believed that homosexuality was genetic. He also questioned if LGBT people were suited to bringing up a child as they have no maternal instinct aroused by the process of pregnancy.

In May 2019, Lee's grandson and son of Lee Hsien Yang, Li Huanwu, who is homosexual, married his partner in South Africa.

References 

Political positions of politicians
Lee Kuan Yew